The Athletics at the 2016 Summer Paralympics – Women's 400 metres T13 event at the 2016 Paralympic Games took place on 17 September 2016, at the Estádio Olímpico João Havelange.

Final 
10:44 17 September 2016:

Notes

Athletics at the 2016 Summer Paralympics